Ronald Woutering (born 24 April 1959) is a retired Dutch swimmer. He competed at the 1976 Summer Olympics in the 200 m butterfly and 400 m individual medley events, but failed to reach the finals.

References

1959 births
Living people
Dutch male butterfly swimmers
Olympic swimmers of the Netherlands
Swimmers at the 1976 Summer Olympics
Swimmers from Rotterdam